Ramchandrapur Union is a Union Parishad under Morrelganj Upazila of Bagerhat District in the division of Khulna, Bangladesh. It has an area of 62.16 km2 (24.00 sq mi) and a population of 21,430.

References

Unions of Morrelganj Upazila
Unions of Bagerhat District
Unions of Khulna Division